Siroco is a 1987 album by flamenco guitarist Paco de Lucía.  There is a "clean" version of Mi Niño Curro (rondeña) offered by iTunes and Amazon.

Track listing
La Cañada (tangos) – 5:15
Mi Niño Curro (rondeña) – 3:28
La Barrosa (alegrías) – 4:36
Caña de Azúcar (rumba) – 4:19
El Pañuelo (bulerías) – 5:27
Callejón del Muro (minera) – 3:55
Casilda (tanguillos) – 3:45
Gloria al Niño Ricardo (soleá) – 5:07

Personnel
Paco de Lucía - Guitar
Rubem Dantas - Cajón, Guitar (tracks 1, 7)
Jose Maria Bandera - Guitar (track 4)
Pepe de Lucía - Talegon claps (track 4)
Ramón de Algeciras - Guitar (track 7)
Juan Ramírez- Dancer (track 3)

References

 Gamboa, Manuel José and Nuñez, Faustino. (2003). Paco de Lucía. Madrid:Universal Music Spain.

External links
Paco de Lucía - Siroco at Timepieces.nl



1987 albums
Paco de Lucía albums